The Women's slalom competition of the 1998 Winter Olympic Games was held at Shiga Kogen.

The defending world champion was Deborah Compagnoni of Italy, while Sweden's Pernilla Wiberg was the defending World Cup slalom champion.

Results

References 

Women's slalom
Olymp
Women's events at the 1998 Winter Olympics